You I Love is a 2004 Russian comedy melodrama directed by Olga Stolpovskaja and Dmitry Troitsky.  It was the first ever film to come from Russia on the subject of homosexuality or bisexuality.

Cast
 Damir Badmaev as Ulyumdzhi
 Lyubov Tolkalina as  Vera Kirillova
 Yevgeny Koryakovsky as Timofey
 Nina Agapova as Timofey's neighbor
 Emanuel Michael Waganda as  John

References

External links

2004 comedy-drama films
2004 LGBT-related films
2004 films
Bisexuality-related films
LGBT-related comedy-drama films
Russian comedy-drama films
Russian LGBT-related films